Sathiamurthy Nagar is located in the Vyasarpadi area of Chennai city in Tamil Nadu.

Another Sathiya Moorthy Nagar is a Nice Village located near Madurai City On NH 7 From Dindigul to Madurai. The economy of Sathiya Moorthy Nagar greatly depends on agriculture, Textile Mills . Around this village are North Side Small Stream, South Side Madurai Power Corporation Plant, East Side Paravai Lake, West Side Small Town "oormachikumlam", and Samayanallur.

Education

Govt High School is located in Sathiya Moorthy Nagar, although most of the people go to other places for schooling. For Higher Studies Every One Move to Samayanallur and Madurai.

Temples and festivals

There Are Four Temples.Santhana mariyamman, Uchima Kali Amman, Raja Kali Amman, Vanakali Amman, Muniyandi Temple, and Muthu Marri Amman Temple.

Entertainment
Children spend more time with Cricket, Gilly, Pamparam, Goli, and few traditional village games. But the younger people enjoy Madurai City with many of entertainment sources.

Neighbourhoods in Chennai